The 2013 European Speed Skating Championships was the 38th continental allround speed skating event for women and the 107th for men. The championships were held at the Thialf in Heerenveen, Netherlands, from 11 through 13 January 2013. Both the men's and women's championship consisted of four separate distance events and the winners are the skaters with the lowest points total after four distances. The competition was also a qualifying event for the 2013 World Allround Speed Skating Championships as the entry quotas were allocated according to the results of the European Championships. Sven Kramer and Ireen Wüst won the European titles.

Venue
The competition took place at the Thialf, Heerenveen, Netherlands, an indoor artificial skating rink, on a standard 400 meters track with inner and outer curves with radii of 26 and 30 meters respectively. The venue has a capacity of 12,500 seats.

Participating nations

A provisional list of competitors and staff had to be presented until 24 December 2012, while the final deadline of applications for the European Championships was closed on 8 January 2013. Every European member federation of the International Skating Union (ISU), whose racer met the qualification criteria were eligible to delegate one participant to the event, and, according to the rules of the ISU, the following nations had the right to enter additional competitors in virtue of their results in the previous continental event:

 Women:
4 competitors: Netherlands
3 competitors: Czech Republic, Germany, Norway, Poland, Russia
2 competitors: Austria, Belgium

 Men:
4 competitors: Netherlands
3 competitors: Norway, Poland 
2 competitors: Austria, Belgium, France, Germany, Italy, Latvia, Russia

Eventually 52 competitors from 17 nations registered officially for the championships, not including the substitutes, in the following distribution:

 (2)
 (2)
 (4)
 (3)
 (1)
 (1)
 (2)
 (5)
 (1)
 (2)
 (1)
 (8)
 (6)
 (6)
 (1)
 (5)
 (1)

Events

Schedule

Women's competition
The women's European Championship were held over two days, Saturday and Sunday, with the 500 and 3000 metre events on the first day, followed by the 1500 and 5000 metre events on the second day. Skaters were awarded points according to their times, and the eight best placed competitors after the second day were eligible to participate in the 5000 metres closing event on the last day of the championship.

Martina Sáblíková was the defending 2012 European Champion and also won the title previously in 2007, 2010 and 2011.

500 metres

3000 metres

1500 metres

5000 metres

Final classification

Men's competition
The men's event took place over three days, with the 500 metres and the 5000 metres race on the first day, the 1500 on the second day and 10,000 meters race on the final day. After the first day, the best 24 out of the 26 skaters got the change to participate in the 5000 meters event, while the best eight competitors after three events took part in the 10,000 meters race.

500 metres

5000 metres

1500 metres

10000 metres

Final classification

See also
 2013 World Allround Speed Skating Championships

References

European Championships
European Speed Skating Championships
European, 2013
2013 in Dutch sport
European Speed Skating Championships, 2013